Loup County is a county in the U.S. state of Nebraska. As of the 2010 United States Census, the population was 632, making it Nebraska's fifth-least populous county and the tenth-least populous county in the United States. Its county seat is Taylor. The county was named after the Pawnee Loup Indians.

In the Nebraska license plate system, Loup County is represented by the prefix 88 (it had the eighty-eighth-largest number of vehicles registered in the county when the license plate system was established in 1922).

Geography
The terrain of Loup County consists of low corrugated flatland, sparsely used for agricultural purposes at present. The ground slopes to the southeast. The Calamus River runs southeastward through the upper center of the county, feeding into the Calamus Reservoir which lies on the county's east border. The North Loup River also runs southeastward through the lower center of the county, exiting eastward near the SE corner to run to its junction with the Calamus River at a point east of Loup County.

Major highways
   U.S. Highway 183
  Nebraska Highway 91
  Nebraska Highway 96

Adjacent counties

 Holt County – northeast
 Garfield County – east
 Custer County – south
 Blaine County – west
 Brown County – northwest
 Rock County – north

Protected area
 Calamus River State Recreation Area

Demographics

As of the 2000 United States Census, there were 632 people, 289 households, and 206 families in the county. The population density was 1.1 people per square mile (0.4/km2). There were 377 housing units at an average density of 0.7 per square mile (0.3/km2). The racial makeup of the county was 98.88% White, 0.28% Native American, 0.14% Asian, 0.42% from other races, and 0.28% from two or more races. 1.69% of the population were Hispanic or Latino of any race.

There were 289 households, out of which 31.80% had children under the age of 18 living with them, 64.70% were married couples living together, 4.20% had a female householder with no husband present, and 28.40% were non-families. 27.00% of all households were made up of individuals, and 17.00% had someone living alone who was 65 years of age or older. The average household size was 2.46 and the average family size was 2.99.

The county population contained 26.70% under the age of 18, 4.50% from 18 to 24, 22.30% from 25 to 44, 27.00% from 45 to 64, and 19.50% who were 65 years of age or older. The median age was 43 years. For every 100 females, there were 108.80 males. For every 100 females age 18 and over, there were 100.00 males.

The median income for a household in the county was $26,250, and the median income for a family was $27,788. Males had a median income of $20,515 versus $20,972 for females. The per capita income for the county was $12,427. About 14.20% of families and 17.70% of the population were below the poverty line, including 22.90% of those under age 18 and 11.60% of those age 65 or over.

Communities

Village 
 Taylor (county seat)

Unincorporated communities 
Almeria
Pioneerville pop: 106 (2010)

Ghost towns 
 Clothstock, Inhabited: 1899–1907, Highest population: 38 (1906)
 Pickiner, Inhabited: 1908–1926, Highest population: 76 (1918)

Politics
Loup County voters have been strongly Republican since the beginning. In only two national elections since 1900 has the county selected the Democratic Party candidate.

See also
 National Register of Historic Places listings in Loup County, Nebraska

References

 
Nebraska counties
1883 establishments in Nebraska
Populated places established in 1883